Leptodeira is a genus of colubrid snakes commonly referred to as cat-eyed snakes. The genus consists of 17 species that are native to primarily Mexico and Central America, but range as far north as the Rio Grande Valley region of Texas in United States and as far south as Argentina in South America.

Species and subspecies
The following species and subspecies are recognized as being valid.
Leptodeira annulata  – banded cat-eyed snake
Leptodeira approximans  
Leptodeira ashmeadii  - banded cat-eyed snake
Leptodeira bakeri  – Baker's cat-eyed snake
Leptodeira frenata  – rainforest cat-eyed snake
Leptodeira frenata frenata 
Leptodeira frenata malleisi 
Leptodeira frenata yucatanensis 
Leptodeira larcorum 
Leptodeira maculata  – southwestern cat-eyed snake
Leptodeira misinawui 
Leptodeira nigrofasciata  – black-banded cat-eyed snake
Leptodeira ornata  - northern cat-eyed snake
Leptodeira polysticta  - small-spotted cat-eyed snake
Leptodeira pulchriceps  
Leptodeira punctata  – western cat-eyed snake
Leptodeira rhombifera  
Leptodeira rubricata  – Costa Rican cat-eyed snake
Leptodeira septentrionalis  – northern cat-eyed snake
Leptodeira splendida  – splendid cat-eyed snake
Leptodeira splendida bressoni 
Leptodeira splendida ephippiata 
Leptodeira splendida splendida 
Leptodeira tarairiu 
Leptodeira uribei  - Uribe’s cat-eyed snake, Uribe's false cat-eyed snake

Nota bene: In the above list, a binomial authority or trinomial authority in parentheses indicates that the species or subspecies was originally described in a genus other than Leptodeira.

References

External links

https://serpientesdevenezuela.org/leptodeira-ashmeadii/
https://serpientesdevenezuela.org/leptodeira-bakeri/

Further reading
Fitzinger L (1843). Systema Reptilium, Fasciculus Primus, Amblyglossae. Vienna: Braumüller & Seidel. 106 pp. + indices. (Leptodeira, new genus, p. 27). (in Latin).
Freiberg M (1982). Snakes of South America. Hong Kong: T.F.H. Publications. 189 pp. . (Genus Leptodeira, pp. 75, 100–101, 133 + photograph on p. 55).

Leptodeira
Snake genera
Taxa named by Leopold Fitzinger